I'll Make All Your Dreams Come True is Ronnie Dove's third album for Diamond Records.

History

The title track peaked at #21 on the Hot 100 chart and #2 on the Easy Listening chart. The other single from the album, Kiss Away, peaked at #25 on the Hot 100 and #5 on the Easy Listening chart.

One song on the album, Put My Mind At Ease, was written and produced by Neil Diamond.  It would later appear as a B-side to Dove's single My Babe in 1967.  My Babe was also written and produced by Diamond.  

The original 1965 release was issued in both stereo and mono.  The album was reissued on CD in the mid 1990s, being paired with Dove’s One Kiss for Old Times' Sake album. More recently, the album was reissued digitally by Ronnie Dove Music, with three songs sourced from newly available tapes that were previously unavailable.

Track listing

1965 albums
Ronnie Dove albums